Ayam Taliwang is a spicy Indonesian grilled chicken (ayam bakar) dish originating from Taliwang in West Nusa Tenggara, Indonesia.

History
Although Ayam Taliwang is said to be a dish favoured by Sasak nobility, Abdul Hamid claims to have invented the dish in 1970.  It is named after Karang Taliwang in Mataram, the capital of Lombok.

Preparation
Ayam Taliwang is made with chicken cut and cleaned prior to grilling. Once it has been grilled halfway, it is removed from the grill and tenderized with a pestle. It is then dipped in cooking oil; after several seconds in the oil, it is put in a spicy sauce of garlic, chili, and shrimp paste. It is then fried or grilled to order.

Presentation
Ayam Taliwang physically appears similar to regular grilled or fried chicken, with a covering of sambal. Its taste is sweet and spicy, with traces of shrimp paste. It can be served with a side of water spinach and eggplant covered with  chili sauce.

Variations
The Taliwang flavour has been adapted for instant noodles.

See also

 List of chicken dishes

References
Footnotes

Bibliography

Lombok culture
Indonesian chicken dishes